Muhammad Andika Kurniawan (born 23 April 1995) is an Indonesian professional footballer who plays as a centre-back for Liga 2 club Semen Padang.

Club career

Borneo FC
In 2020, Andika Kurniawan signed for Indonesian Liga 1 club Borneo. This season was suspended on 27 March 2020 due to the COVID-19 pandemic. The season was abandoned and was declared void on 20 January 2021.

Return to Persiraja
He was signed for Persiraja Banda Aceh to play in the Liga 1 in the 2021-22 season. Andhika made his league debut on 7 January 2022 in a match against PSS Sleman at the Ngurah Rai Stadium, Denpasar.

Semen Padang
Andhika was signed for Semen Padang to play in Liga 2 in the 2022–23 season. He made his league debut on 29 August 2022 in a match against PSPS Riau at the Riau Main Stadium, Riau.

Honours

Club
Persiraja Banda Aceh
 Liga 2 third place (play-offs): 2019

References

External links
 Andika Kurniawan at Soccerway
 Andika Kurniawan at Liga Indonesia

1995 births
Living people
Indonesian footballers
PSPS Riau players
Persiraja Banda Aceh players
Borneo F.C. players
Liga 1 (Indonesia) players
Sportspeople from Jambi
Association football central defenders